The Immergut Festival is a yearly music festival in Germany in Neustrelitz, Mecklenburg-Vorpommern. The first edition was organised in 2000. The festival focuses mainly on indie rock and is one of the largest festivals in Germany for this genre.

Line-ups 
2000: Beatsteaks, Die Jones, Luke, Nevis, Porous, Pussybox, Readymade, Samba, Soulmate, Sportfreunde Stiller, Sweet Zoe, Tricky Lobsters, Virginia Jetzt!
2001: Donots, Blackmail, Readymade, Miles, Slut, Beatsteaks, Tom Liwa, Tomte, Sofaplanet, Eskobar, Pale, Porous, Virginia Jetzt!, Friends of Dean Martinez, Sportfreunde Stiller
2002: Aerogramme, Astra Kid, Beatsteaks, Bernd Begemann, Das Pop, Die Sterne, Dyade, Kettcar, MIA., One Man and his Droid, Pluxus, Samba, Scumbucket, Solarscape, Soulmate, The Monochords, The Soundtrack of our Lives, Tocotronic, Tomte
2003: Therapy?, Console, Readymade, Miles, Pale, Slut, Fireside, Kante, Superpunk, Blackmail, Virginia Jetzt!, The Robocop Kraus, Pelzig, Chokebore, Cursive
2004: The Notwist, The Weakerthans, Adam Green, Broken Social Scene, Kettcar, Tomte, Tele, Porous, Tiger Lou, Bernd Begemann, Naked Lunch, Lali Puna, Marr
2005: Maxïmo Park, Nada Surf, Deichkind, Moneybrother, Puppetmastaz, Kante, The Album Leaf, Koufax, The Robocop Kraus, Last Days of April, Boxhamsters, Madsen, Kate Mosh, Angelika Express
2006: Broken Social Scene, Blumfeld, Tomte, Yeah Yeah Yeahs, Art Brut, Die Regierung, MIA., Okkervil River, The Appleseed Cast, Pale, Klez.e, Flowerpornoes, Phantom/Ghost, Fotos, Midlake, Mew, Luke
2007: Polarkreis 18, Muff Potter, Tele, Friska Viljor, Shout Out Louds, Naked Lunch, Architecture in Helsinki, Malajube, Tocotronic, Tied & Tickled Trio, Someone Still Loves You Boris Yeltsin, Virginia Jetzt!, Ragazzi, Sophia, Superpunk, Lichter, Seidenmatt
2008: Studio Braun, Get Well Soon, iLiKETRAiNS, Slut, Louie Austen, The Weakerthans, The Audience, Ólafur Arnalds, The Notwist, Microstern, PeterLicht, Blood Red Shoes, Johnossi, Lo-Fi-Fnk, Menomena, The Lemonheads, Trip Fontaine, Cartridge, Fotos, Girls in Hawaii
2009: The Whitest Boy Alive, Polarkreis 18, Die Sterne, Samba, Bodi Bill, Hello Saferide, Hundreds, Jeans Team, Kettcar, Olli Schulz, Pale, Sometree, The Soundtrack of our Lives, Tilman Rossmy, Timid Tiger, Tomte, Virginia Jetzt!, Frittenbude
2010: Jens Friebe, Everything Everything, Vierkanttretlager, Official Secret Act, We Were Promised Jetpacks, The Go! Team, Bonaparte, The Kissaway Trail, Ja, Panik,  Rocko Schamoni, Chikinki, Mediengruppe Telekommander, Efterklang, Two Door Cinema Club, Tokyo Police Club, FM Belfast, My Awesome Mixtape, I Heart Sharks
2011: Ariane Grundies, Balthazar, Brandt Brauer Frick, Chuckamuck, The Crookes, Darwin Deez, dEUS, Erobique, Frank Spilker, Gisbert zu Knyphausen, Hans Unstern & Band, Herrenmagazin, Jason Collett, Jürgen Kuttner, Lea Groß, Lisa Hofmann & Johanna Lucklum, Lissy-Therea Willberg, Martina Hoffmann, Michael Kellenbenz, Mogwai, Nagel, Nôze, Ra Ra Riot, Retro Stefson, Sarah Domann, Station 17, Those Dancing Days, Tino Hanekamp, Touchy Mob, Ulrike Jäger, Waters, Who Knew
2012: Alle Farben, Blood Red Shoes, Die Höchste Eisenbahn, Die Vögel, Einar Stray, Francis International Airport, Friska Viljor, Hauschka, Heinz Strunk, Hundreds, Immanu El, Kakkmaddafakka, Leif Randt, Me And My Drummer, New Build, Pupkulies & Rebecca, Sandro Perri, Sin Fang, Slagsmalsklubben, Sóley, Tall Ships, The Hidden Cameras, The Hundred in the Hands, The Mouse Folk, Tiere Streicheln Menschen, Totally Enormous Extinct Dinosaurs, Vierkanttretlager, WhoMadeWho
2013: Beach Fossils, Christian Löffler, David Jonathan, Die Heiterkeit, Dry The River, Efterklang, Fenster, Fraktus, Gold Panda, Honig, Jens Lekman, Karrera Klub, La Boum Fatalle ft. Thomalla, Leslie Clio, Roosevelt, Royal Canoe, Team Me, The Notwist, The Vaccines, Toy, We Were Promised Jetpacks, When Saints Go Machine, White Fence, Xul Zolar, Young Dreams
 2014: All The Luck In The World, Bonaparte, Cloud Nothings, Die! Die! Die!, Einar Stray, Feine Sahne Fischfilet, Felix Scharlau, FM Belfast, Future Islands, Girls in Hawaii, Hundreds, Jan Roth, Judith Holofernes, Justus Köhncke, Karrera Klub (DJ-Team), Kombinat 100, Kommando Tanzbrause (DJ-Team), La Femme, Lucy Rose, Moddi, Mozes And The Firstborn, Oum Shatt, Paul Bokowski (reading), Rah Rah, Real Estate, Robag Wruhme, SeaChange, Slut, Sven Regener (reading), Tiere streicheln Menschen (reading), Wye Oak
 2015: Erlend Øye, Element Of Crime, Battles, Ωracles / Oracles, Die Nerven, Gereon Klug & Maurice Summen (reading), Ducktails, The/Das, Von Spar, Jonas Alaska, Balthazar, Trümmer, Occupanther, Jacob Korn, TOPS, Beaty Heart, King Khan And The Shrines, Francesco Wilking, Moritz Krämer, Missincat, Zentralheizung of Death, Ghostpoet, Drenge, Sticky Fingers, Linus Volkmann, Egokind & Ozean
2016: Get Well Soon, Schnipo Schranke, We Are The City, PeterLicht, Maurice Summen, SUUNS, Isolation Berlin, Stefanie Sargnagel, Jochen Distelmeyer, Vita Bergen, Tocotronic, Maximo Park, LUH., Drangsal, Sean Nicholas Savage, Peter Bjorn and John, Fat White Family, Coma, Is Tropical, Nagel & Manuel Möglich, Frankie Cosmos, White Wine Music, Liima, DJ Phono, Eddie Argos von Art Brut
 2017: Portugal. The Man, Broken Social Scene, Local Natives, Shout Out Louds, Angel Olsen, Die Höchste Eisenbahn, Mew, Die Sterne, Bernd Begemann, Motorama, Christian Löffler, Sinkane, !!! (Chk Chk Chk), Giant Rooks, Fazerdaze, Dan Croll, Homeshake, Lea Porcelain, Cuthead, Wand, Friends of Gas, Kalipo, $ick (Shore, Stein, Papier), Preoccupations, Julien Baker, Voodoo Jürgens, Schorsch Kamerun, Ronja von Rönne, Jens Balzer
 2018: , Anja Rützel, Bayonne, Christiane Rösinger (reading), Das Paradies, Die Nerven, Drangsal, Fil Bo Riva, Granadamusik, Gurr, Ilgen-Nur, Kat Frankie, Kero Kero Bonito, Kettcar, Lambert, Makeness, Maurice & Die Familie Summen, Mourn, Olli Schulz, Pom Poko, Roosevelt, Sam Vance-Law, Suff Daddy & The Lunch Birds, Ty Segall
 2019: Alli Neumann, Balthazar, Bilderbuch, Black Midi, Blvth, Boy Harsher, Cate Le Bon, Dagobert, Deerhunter, Dena, Die Wände, Fenster, Fontaines D.C., Frittenbude, Gewalt Band, Giulia Becker, Heinz Strunk, Hope, International Music, Isolation Berlin, Isolée, Kala Brisella, Karen Gwyer, Karies, Komfortrauschen, Kommode, Lauer, Leoniden, Linus Volkmann, Mavi Phoenix, Monako, Nilüfer Yanya, Priests, Roosevelt, Shelter Boy, Some Sprouts, Sophia Kennedy
 2020: Canceled due to the COVID-19 pandemic.

References

External links

 Official website

Events in Mecklenburg-Western Pomerania
Music in Mecklenburg-Western Pomerania
Rock festivals in Germany